Musa Bagh (translation: Garden of Moses), also known as Monsieur Bagh, is an extensive garden complex in the city of Lucknow of the Awadh region of India.

See also
Architecture of Lucknow

References

External links
Musa Bagh

Gardens in Lucknow